Angophora costata subsp. euryphylla is a species of medium-sized to large tree that is endemic to a restricted area of New South Wales. It has smooth bark, lance-shaped adult leaves, flower buds in groups of three, white or creamy white flowers and cylindrical to barrel-shaped fruit. It is similar to subspecies costata but has broader leaves and larger fruit.

Description
It has smooth pinkish to orange bark that weathers to grey. Flowering has been observed in November.

Taxonomy and naming
Metrosideros costata was first formally described in 1788 by Joseph Gaertner. In 1916 James Britten changed the name to Angophora costata and in 1986 Gregory John Leach described three subspecies, including subspecies euryphylla. The type specimens were collected near Putty in 1971. The epithet (euryphylla) is from ancient Greek words meaning "broad" and "leaf".

Distribution and habitat
This eucalypt subspecies is restricted to rocky sandstone outcrops in open forest near Putty, in the Howes Valley and Judge Dowling Range.

References

costata
Flora of New South Wales
Trees of Australia
Plants described in 1986